Gabriel Garcete Jimenez (born 7 January 1982) is a Paraguayan professional footballer.

He started his career with Sportivo Luqueño in 2000. The next season, he moved on to play for Municipal Limeño. In 2005, he made a transfer to Atlético Balboa. He went on to play for Chalatenango of El Salvador after.

In 2007 Garcete returned to Sportivo Luqueño. The next season, he returned to El Salvador to join FAS in the Primera División de Fútbol Profesional of El Salvador, but was later released.

In 2008, he joined Isidro Metapán in El Salvador.

In 2010, he joined UES however he did not live up to expectation and was released by the club.

References

Living people
1982 births
Paraguayan footballers
Sportivo Luqueño players
Expatriate footballers in El Salvador
C.D. FAS footballers
Atlético Balboa footballers
A.D. Isidro Metapán footballers
C.D. Chalatenango footballers
Association football forwards